The Wissenschaftsrat (WR; German Science and Humanities Council) is an advisory body to the German Federal Government and the state (Länder) governments. It makes recommendations on the development of science, research, and the universities, as well as on the competitiveness of German science. These recommendations involve both quantitative and financial considerations, as well as their implementation. Funding is provided by the federal and state governments.

The Wissenschaftliche Kommission (Scientific Commission) of the Wissenschaftsrat has 32 members appointed by the Federal President. Twenty-four scientists are jointly proposed by the Deutsche Forschungsgemeinschaft (DFG, German Research Foundation), the Max-Planck-Gesellschaft zur Förderung der Wissenschaften (MPG, Max Planck Society for the Advancement of Science), the Hochschulrektorenkonferenz (HRK, German Rector’s Conference), the Helmholtz Association of German Research Centres, the Fraunhofer-Gesellschaft (FhG, Fraunhofer Society), and the Wissenschaftsgemeinschaft Gottfried Wilhelm Leibniz (WGL, Gottfried Wilhelm Leibniz Scientific Community). Another eight persons of high public standing are jointly proposed by the Federal Government and the state (Länder) governments.

Presidents
Presidents (Vorsitzender) of the organization:

 1958–1961 – Helmut Coing 
 1961–1965 – Ludwig Raiser
 1965–1969 – Hans Leussink 
 1969–1972 – Reimar Lüst 
 1972–1976 – Theodor Heidhues
 1976–1979 – Wilhelm A. Kewenig
 1979–1982 – Andreas Heldrich
 1982–1985 – Hans-Jürgen Engell
 1985–1987 – Heinz Heckhausen 
 1987–1989 – Kurt Kochsiek
 1989-1993– Dieter Simon
 1993–1994 – Gerhard Neuweiler
 1994–1996 – Karl-Heinz Hoffmann
 1996–1998 – Dagmar Schipanski
 1998–2001 – Winfried Schulze
 2001–2006 – Karl Max Einhäupl
 2006–2011 – Peter Strohschneider
 2011–2014 – Wolfgang Marquardt
 2014–2017 – Manfred Prenzel
 2017–2020 – Martina Brockmeier
 2020–present – Dorothea Wagner

Notes

See also
Educational accreditation in Germany

Humanities organizations
Arts organisations based in Germany
Scientific organisations based in Germany
Arts organizations established in 1957
Scientific organizations established in 1957
1957 establishments in West Germany